The 2013–14 UTEP Miners basketball team represented the University of Texas at El Paso during the 2013–14 NCAA Division I men's basketball season. The Miners, led by fourth year head coach Tim Floyd, played their home games at the Don Haskins Center and were members of Conference USA. They finished the season 23–11, 12–4 in C-USA play to finish in fifth place. They advanced to the quarterfinals of the C-USA tournament where they lost to Southern Miss. They were invited to the College Basketball Invitational where they lost in the first round to Fresno State. UTEP averaged 8,088 fans per game, ranking 58th nationally.

Roster

Schedule

|-
!colspan=9 style="background:#FF7F00; color:#000080;"| Exhibition

|-
!colspan=9 style="background:#FF7F00; color:#000080;"| Regular season

|-
!colspan=9 style="background:#FF7F00; color:#000080;"| Conference USA tournament

|-
!colspan=9 style="background:#FF7F00; color:#000080;"| CBI

See also
2013–14 UTEP Lady Miners basketball team

References

UTEP Miners men's basketball seasons
UTEP
UTEP